Thomas Fauset MacDonald (1862 – 14 December 1910) was a Scottish physician and veterinarian who was active in the British anarchist movement and later the Australian white supremacist and eugenics movements.

Biography 
MacDonald was born in 1862 to Thomas MacDonald, a GP, and Jane MacDonald. He followed his father into medicine, studying at the University of Glasgow and graduating in 1882. He travelled to Australia and New Zealand and studied tropical diseases, returning to Scotland in 1889. In 1892 he was awarded a veterinary degree.

In 1893, MacDonald began to take an active part in the anarchist movement in London, becoming a financial backer and for a time an unofficial editor of the Socialist League's newspaper Commonweal. At this time MacDonald also inspired the character Dr Armitage in Olivia Rossetti's semi-fictional novel A Girl Among the Anarchists. Former Commonweal editor David Nicoll publicly accused MacDonald of being a police spy and of supplying the sulphuric acid used to build the bomb which had killed Martial Bourdin in February 1894. Efforts were made unsuccessfully by Max Nettlau and Peter Kropotkin to have Nicoll withdraw the accusations.

In 1895 MacDonald moved to Queensland, Australia. In 1897 he moved to Geraldton, Queensland, where he ran a small cottage hospital. From 1903 he began advocating for white supremacy and eugenics, while occasionally still speaking on socialism and anarchism. In 1906 he moved to Wellington, New Zealand where he became active in the New Zealand Socialist Party, but was soon removed from the party. In 1907 he founded the White Race League with himself as president, though his presidency was short-lived. In 1909 he published a book of verse titled North Sea Lyrics.

In 1910 he moved to San Pedro, Ivory Coast, dying there later that year from yellow fever aged 48.

References 

Scottish anarchists
19th-century Scottish medical doctors
20th-century Scottish medical doctors
Scottish veterinarians
1862 births
1910 deaths
British white supremacists
Eugenicists
Socialist League (UK, 1885) members
Alumni of the University of Glasgow Medical School